The Kunigami or Northern Okinawan language, is a Ryukyuan language of Northern Okinawa Island in Kunigami District and city of Nago, otherwise known as the Yanbaru region, historically the territory of the kingdom of Hokuzan. 

The Nakijin dialect is often considered representative of Kunigami, analogous to the Shuri-Naha dialect of Central Okinawan. The number of fluent native speakers of Kunigami is not known. As a result of Japanese language policy, the younger generation mostly speaks Japanese as their first language.

Location
In addition to the northern portion of Okinawa Island, Kunigami is spoken on the small neighboring islands of Ie, Tsuken and Kudaka.

Scope and classification
Glottolog, following Pellard (2009), classifies Kunigami with Central Okinawan as the two Okinawan languages.  Ethnologue adds Okinoerabu and Yoron; these (along with all other languages of the northern Ryukyu Islands) are classified as Amami languages by Glottolog. The UNESCO Atlas of the World's Languages in Danger, following Uemura (2003), includes Okinoerabu and Yoron as varieties of Kunigami.

Folk terminology

The speakers of Kunigami have various words for "language", "dialect", and "style of speech". The Yonamine dialect was part of Nakijin's western dialect called . The northern part of Okinawa was colloquially known as Yanbaru and hence its language was sometimes called .

Phonology
Like most Ryukyuan languages north of Central Okinawan, Kunigami has series of so-called "tensed" or "glottalized" consonants. While the nasals and glides are truly glottalized, the stops are tenuis , in contrast to the aspiration of the "plain" stops . Thus, for example, the Nakijin dialect of Kunigami has  (light, a lamp, a shōji), which is cognate with Japanese  (light, a lamp); the Kunigami form is distinguished from its Japanese cognate by the initial , tenuis , and elision of Proto-Japonic *r before *i.

Morphology
One notable difference in the use of certain morphological markers between Kunigami language and Standard Japanese is the use of the  form as an adverb in Kunigami: e.g. Nakijin dialect , which is equivalent to Standard Japanese toókú hanárete irú ("It is far away"). In Standard Japanese, the  form is used adverbially, while the  form is used exclusively to derive abstract nouns of quality and amount ("-ness" forms) from adjectival stems.

References

Ryukyuan languages